The Lampi Island Marine National Park is a marine national park in Myanmar covering . It was established in 1996. The national park is an Important Bird Area and one of the ASEAN Heritage Parks. Access is restricted to day-time visits.

Seagrass is present around the eastern part of the island, comprising Thalassianthus hemprichi, Cymodocea rotundata, Halodule uninervis, H. pinifolia and dugong grass (Halophila ovalis).

The presence of dugong (Dugong dugon) on Lampi island was confirmed for the first time in March 2008. Since then, trails left by dugong to dugong grass patches were observed repeatedly.

During a survey in 2013, carapaces of leatherback sea turtle (Dermochelys coriacea), green sea turtle (Chelonia mydas), hawksbill sea turtle (Eretmochelys imbricata) and Oldham’s leaf turtle (Cyclemys oldhamii) were found on Lampi Island. Pope’s tree pitviper (Trimeresurus popeiorum), water monitor (Varanus salvator) and Tokay gecko (Gekko gecko) were observed. Reticulated python (Python reticulatus) occurs as well.

A camera trapping survey between November 2015 and May 2017 revealed the presence of smooth-coated otter (Lutrogale perspicillata), Asian palm civet (Paradoxurus hermaphroditus), small-toothed palm civet (Arctogalidia trivirgata), long-tailed macaque (Macaca fascicularis), northern pig-tailed macaque (M. leonina), dusky langur (Trachypithecus obscurus), Bengal slow loris (Nycticebus bengalensis), lesser mouse deer (Tragulus kanchil lampensis), wild boar (Sus scrofa), Sunda pangolin (Manis javanica), northern treeshrew (Tupaia belangeri), red giant flying squirrel (Petaurista petaurista), black giant squirrel (Ratufa bicolour), grey-bellied squirrel (Callosciurus caniceps), Pallas's squirrel (C. erythraeus), Berdmore's ground squirrel (Menetes berdmorei), long-tailed giant rat (Leopoldamys sabanus) and red spiny rat (Maxomys surifer).

References

External links

National parks of Myanmar
Protected areas established in 1996
Marine parks
ASEAN heritage parks
Important Bird Areas of Myanmar